The Life and Times of Juniper Lee is an American cartoon series. It lasted for three seasons on Cartoon Network, debuting on May 30, 2005, and lasting until December 15, 2006. The show spanned 40 episodes (2 of them unaired) across 3 seasons. All the episodes are directed by Frank Squillace.

Series overview

Episodes

Season 1 (2005)

Season 2 (2005–06)

Season 3 (2006)

Shorts (2006–07)

Lists of Cartoon Network television series episodes
Life and Times of Juniper Lee, The